Netherton is a rural community in the Hauraki District and Waikato region of New Zealand's North Island.

Education

References 

Hauraki District
Populated places in Waikato